Nahr-e Hamud (also Romanized as Nahr-e Hamūd and Nahr-e Ḩamūd) is a village in Abshar Rural District, in the Central District of Shadegan County, Khuzestan Province, Iran. At the 2006 census, its population was 140, in 28 families.

References 

Populated places in Shadegan County